KQRA (102.1 FM) is a commercial radio station located in Brookline, Missouri, broadcasting to the Springfield, Missouri, area. KQRA airs an active rock music format branded as "Q102-1".

The station is the local affiliate of the Lex and Terry Morning Show.

External links
Official website

QRA
Active rock radio stations in the United States
Radio stations established in 1987